"Paris in the Spring" is a popular song composed in 1935, with lyrics by Mack Gordon and music by Harry Revel. It was first introduced by Mary Ellis in the film Paris in Spring. A version was also recorded by Ray Noble and His Orchestra (also in 1935). In 1960, Jo Stafford and her husband Paul Weston recorded a version for their comedy album Jonathan and Darlene Edwards in Paris in which they put their own unique interpretation on the song.

Notable recordings

Ray Noble (1935)
Jo Stafford - Jonathan and Darlene Edwards in Paris (1960)

References

1935 songs
Songs with lyrics by Mack Gordon
Songs with music by Harry Revel
Jo Stafford songs